Deep Forest is a French music project that originally began as a duo consisting of Michel Sanchez and Éric Mouquet. They compose a style of world music, sometimes called ethnic electronica, mixing ethnic with electronic sounds and dance beats or chillout beats. Their sound has been described as an "ethno-introspective ambient world music". They were nominated for a Grammy Award in 1994 for Best World Music Album, and in 1995 they won the Award for the album Boheme. The group also became World Music Awards Winner – French group with the highest 1995 world sales. Their albums have sold over 10 million copies. Sanchez started his own career as a singer in 2005, while Mouquet continued working under the band's original name.

History
Michel Sanchez came up with the idea of mixing the native Baka pygmy spoken word with modern music after hearing on-site recordings of these tribes conversing. Along with Eric Mouquet they created the project Deep Forest. Their first self-titled album (nominated for a Grammy) was released in 1992, with "Sweet Lullaby" being the smash single which would put Deep Forest on the musical map (UK Top 10 hit). The song "Sweet Lullaby" is adapted from a traditional song from the Solomon Islands. A lullaby named "Rorogwela", sung by Afunakwa, a Northern Malaita woman, was used as a vocal sample in the "Sweet Lullaby". The album Deep Forest was dance-driven and the samples were heavily digitised and edited. It was re-released as a limited edition in 1994 under the name World Mix. "Sweet Lullaby" also uses Baka water drumming in the background. 

For their second album Boheme, Eric and Michel left behind the sounds of the forest and ventured into Eastern Europe bringing tender, lonesome Hungarian and Roma chants with upbeat, yet sad, music. Due to this shift, Dan Lacksman (from Telex, producer and sound-engineer of the first album) decided to go his separate way and continued working on other projects like Pangea. The chants were no longer brief, instead extended phrases had been sampled from Hungarian, and Russian. Hungarian singer Márta Sebestyén and Bulgarian Kate Petrova performed on this album. 
The duo also performed and produced the remixes for the Youssou N'Dour single "Undecided" in 1994, with guest vocals by Neneh Cherry (who featured on n'Dour's break-through single "Seven Seconds"). That same year Deep Forest made remixes for Jon Anderson's "Deseo", Apollo 440's "Liquid Cool" and Cesária Évora's "My Fatigue is Endless". In 1996 Deep Forest collaborated with Peter Gabriel on the song "While the Earth Sleeps" which was written for the film Strange Days.

The follow-up third album, Comparsa, contained Spanish chants and sounds. The music is often upbeat and celebratory. The last song from the album, Media Luna, which was also released as a single, features a duet of Syrian and Spanish singers Abed Azrei and Ana Torroja.The duo collaborated with Joe Zawinul on the song Deep Weather during the recording of the album.
Also Jorge Reyes (late Mexican musician), collaborated in this album with percussion, vocals and the flute.

A recording of their live concert in Japan was also released on a CD called Made in Japan. Although all the songs featured in the show are from the previous three albums, they have new often-longer arrangements and all the chants are performed and reinterpreted by live performers.

In 1999 Deep Forest worked with Cheb Mami and Catherine Lara on the song "L'Enfant Fleur" which had been composed for Sol En Si (a French charity which helps HIV families).

In 2000, Deep Forest released their fourth album, Pacifique. This album was composed to support the movie "Le prince du Pacifique" It mixes Pacific and island beats with electronic music.

Music Detected was the title of their fifth much-anticipated official Deep Forest album which saw the duo turn its attention to the Far East and the Orient for inspiration. It also signalled a change in musical style for Deep Forest, from dance to a more rock-influence. They collaborated with Indonesian pop musician Anggun on the bilingual song Deep Blue Sea which served as the lead single.

In 2003 Deep Forest released a compilation album Essence of the Forest, with some remastered tracks.
In 2004 Deep Forest collaborated with Josh Groban, he composed and produced 2 songs on the album Closer.
In 2006 Deep Forest collaborated with Josh Groban on the album Awake. 
In 2008 Deep Forest released the album Deep Brasil, a collaboration with Brazilian artist Flavio Dell Isola.
During 2009-2010 Deep Forest went with a new band formula on stage and Deep Forest performed in different countries and continents (China, Africa, the United States, Japan, France...).
In 2014  Deep Forest Released the Album  "Deep Africa"

In 2013 Sony music India released Deep India, a Deep Forest and Rahul Sharma collaboration.

In 2017, the band collaborated with Ukrainian folk project Onuka on the song "VSESVIT". The track is part of Onuka's second studio album "MOZAїKA"

Music for films
In 1994, Deep Forest appeared on the soundtrack for Robert Altman's Prêt-à-Porter with the song "Martha".

Deep Forest was hired to provide a full original score for the 1995 movie Strange Days and their credit appears on early advertising for the film. In the end, the score was instead composed by Graeme Revell. One cue from Deep Forest's original music remains in the film, titled "Coral Lounge". Deep Forest also teamed with Peter Gabriel to write an original song, "While the Earth Sleeps", for the film's end credits. In addition, two tracks from Deep Forest's album "Boheme" were featured in the film - "Anasthasia" and "Bohemian Ballet. The two new Deep Forest tracks, "Coral Lounge" and "While the Earth Sleeps", were included on the film's soundtrack album. The version of "While the Earth Sleeps" on the album is an edited version. The complete film version was released by Columbia as a CD single in Austria and Japan.

One of Deep Forest's songs, "Night Bird", was used in the 1996 film version of The Island of Dr. Moreau.

In December 2000, Deep Forest composed a soundtrack for the French film Le Prince du Pacifique. The album, entitled Pacifique, is a return to a more ambient and melancholy sound, with piano themes riding above moody synth textures, Pacific Island chants, scratchy synth-leads and electronic drumming.

In 2004 the duo composed a soundtrack for the Japanese film Kusa No Ran. A remix of "Sweet Lullaby" was also used for Matt Harding's viral hit "Where the Hell is Matt?"

Side projects
Both Sanchez and Mouquet have worked over a variety of side-projects and solo albums. Sanchez has two solo albums out and produced Wes successful debut album; while Mouquet created the group Dao Dezi, collaborated with Catherine Lara and arranged Thorgal, he composed and produced songs for Ana Torroja (Mecano), Jean Sebastien Lavoie, and composed and produced songs for Josh Groban.

Live performances
Deep Forest had their first live concert in 1996 at the G7 Summit in Lyon, France. They continued from there on to the Deep Forest '96 world tour. During the 1996 tour, Deep Forest performed a number of shows in France, Hungary, Greece, Australia, Japan, Poland and US. After the completion of Comparsa there was a '98 world tour. Since '98 there have been numerous live performances, including the Image Concerts, which took place in Japan. The concerts were based around the 'Image' album (similar to Pure Moods) and featured a number of famous Japanese artists, also including Deep Forest.

Donations
A percentage of proceeds from Deep Forest's debut album sales went to the Pygmy Fund, set up to aid the Democratic Republic of the Congo's Efe pygmies in the transition from nomadic to agrarian subsistence, and to provide appropriate health care. However, music of the Efe people was not included on the record, and so the musicians sampled on the record would not have benefited.
A portion of the proceeds from 'Boheme' go to the György Martin Foundation, which aids in protecting the Roma culture of Hungary.
Deep Forest also actively supports the Sana Madagascar Association starting with 'Comparsa'. "The aim of the Sana Madagascar Association is to contribute protecting the environment, to collect instruments and precious recordings in order to allow the Malagasy man to save his culture, his nature and his traditional music."

Controversy 
The song "Freedom Cry" from the album Boheme caused controversy when it was revealed that the Hungarian Roma singer, Károly Rostás ("Huttyán"), never received any monetary compensation from the song, and neither did his family after he died in 1986. His singing, archived by Claude Flagel, was sampled by Deep Forest. Flagel allegedly paid Huttyán 1500 forints for the recording. The case was later documented in a movie entitled Huttyán, released in 1996.
The relatives did succeed to some extent to get compensation from Deep Forest.

Deep Forest's signature song "Sweet Lullaby" centres around an uncredited recording of ancestral Baegu lullaby, "Rorogwela", from Malaita, sung by a woman named Afunakwa, and recorded by ethnomusicologist Hugo Zemp. The recording was used without authorization from Afunakwa, Zemp, label UNESCO discs or distributor Auvidis, although Zemp had earlier reluctantly given oral permission for an unrelated recording to be used. The Deep Forest project has since become a cause celèbre as an example of primitivist caricature and cultural appropriation.

Influences
Mouquet was influenced by his interests in house and techno music.

Awards

Nominations in France and the US
1993:  MTV Awards Best Video - "Sweet Lullaby"
1993:  Victoires de la Musique Best Album - World Music
1993:  Victoires de la Musique Best Group of the Year
1995:  World Music Awards Winner - French group with the highest 1995 world sales
1995:  Grammy Awards Winner - Best Album - World Music
1996:  Victoires de la Musique - Best Group of the Year
1996:  Victoires de la Musique - Best Album - World Music

Discography

Albums
 Studio albums
 1992: Deep Forest (also known as World Mix) • 3 mil. copies sold 
 1995: Boheme • 4 mil. copies sold
 1998: Comparsa • 1 mil. copies sold
 2002: Music Detected • 500,000 copies sold
 2008: Deep Brasil
 2013: Deep India (with Rahul Sharma)
 2013: Deep Africa
 2015: Evo Devo
 2018: Epic Circuits (with Gaudi)
 2020: Deep Symphonic

 Live albums
 1999: Made in Japan • 150,000 copies sold

 Soundtracks
 2000: Pacifique
 2004: Kusa no Ran • released only in Japan

 Compilations
 2003: Essence of Deep Forest • released only in Japan
 2004: Essence of the Forest • three different editions

Singles
 1992 – "Deep Forest" (UK #20) 
 1992 – "Sweet Lullaby" (UK #10, U.S. #78 - over 1 million copies sold)
 1992 – "White Whisper"
 1993 – "Forest Hymn"
 1994 – "Savana Dance" (UK #28)
 1994 – "Undecided" (collaboration with Youssou N'dour)
 1995 – "Boheme"
 1995 – "Marta's Song" (UK #26 (collaboration with Márta Sebestyén))
 1996 – "While the Earth Sleeps" (collaboration with Peter Gabriel)
 1996 – "Bohemian Ballet" (promo)
 1997 – "Freedom Cry"
 1997 – "Madazulu"
 1998 – "Media Luna"
 1998 – "Noonday Sun"
 1999 – "Hunting" (Live)
 1999 – "Sweet Lullaby" (live)
 2000 – "Pacifique"
 2002 – "Deep Blue Sea" (INA #2 (collaboration with Anggun))
 2002 – "Endangered Species"
 2002 – "Will You Be Ready" (promo)

Other releases 
 Michel Sanchez albums
 1994: Windows • produced by Dan Lacksman and himself
 2000: Hiéroglyphes • produced by himself 
 2008: The Day Of A Paper Bird • produced by himself
 2008: The Touch • produced by himself
 2014: Eliott • produced by himself
 2015: The Man And The Machine • produced by himself
 2016: Ça Sent L'Jazz (EP) • produced by himself
 2016: Windows II • produced by himself

 Eric Mouquet's albums 
 
 2008: Deep Brasil • as Deep Projects
 2013: Deep India • as Deep Forest & Rahul Sharma
 2013: Deep Africa • as Deep Forest Eric Mouquet

 Collaborations
 1999: Aral with Catherine Lara
 2003: Closer with Josh Groban
 2006: Awake with Josh Groban
 2012: Files under Zawinhul with Joe Zawinul
 2018: Epic Circuits with Gaudi

Trivia 
 According to Mouquet, the name 'Deep Forest' originates from a combination of Deep Purple and rain forest.

See also 
List of ambient music artists

References

External links
 Deep Forest Official Website

New-age music groups
French world music groups
French electronic musicians
Grammy Award winners
Musical groups established in 1992
550 Music artists